Lusagyugh or Lusagyukh or Lusaghyugh may refer to:
Lusagyugh, Aragatsotn, Armenia
Lusagyugh, Armavir, Armenia